During the 1932–33 English football season, Brentford competed in the Football League Third Division South and won the division title to secure promotion to the second tier of English football for the first time in the club's history. Jack Holliday set a new club goalscoring record of 39 goals in a season, which as of  has yet to be broken. It is statistically Brentford's second-best season, after 1929–30.

Season summary

Brentford manager Harry Curtis made a number of signings in the 1932 off-season, but none would prove more crucial to the club's future success than the acquisition of forwards Jack Holliday, Billy Scott and half back Herbert Watson from First Division Middlesbrough for a combined £1,500 fee in May 1932, with the majority of the money having been raised by the sale of record goalscorer Billy Lane to Watford earlier that month. The club entered the season with one of its youngest-ever squads.

Brentford had a dream start to the Third Division South season, going undefeated and winning 12 of the opening 14 matches, setting a new club record of 16 consecutive undefeated Football League matches, a run which began with wins in the final two matches of the 1931–32 season. The record stood until it was overtaken during 2013–14. The Bees hit top spot after the second match of the season and after briefly dropping back to 2nd on goal difference, they quickly rose back to the summit and would remain there until a 5–5 draw with Luton Town (which set a new club record for highest aggregate score in an away Football League match) on 1 February 1933 dropped the club back to 2nd. Manager Curtis signed a new three-year contract in January 1933 and forward Jack Holliday was in prolific scoring form, hitting 26 goals in his first 20 appearances of the season, including four hat-tricks, one of which comprised five goals in the draw with Luton Town, making him the first player to score five goals for Brentford in a Football League match.

Brentford went back to the top of the table after a 6–0 victory over Newport County on 4 February, the team's biggest victory of the season. Aside from a minor blip in mid-March through to early-April, the Bees held onto top spot and clinched the Third Division South championship after a 2–1 victory over Brighton & Hove Albion on 26 April 1933, with nearest rivals Exeter City five points behind with only two matches to play. Brentford drew the remaining three matches of the season and were promoted to the Second Division for the first time in the club's history.

Jack Holliday broke Billy Lane's three-year old club record for most goals in a season with four strikes in a 7–3 mauling of Cardiff City on 1 April and he finished the season with 39 goals in all competitions. Despite his exploits, Holliday did not finish as the Third Division South's top scorer, due to Coventry City's Clarrie Bourton bettering Holliday's total of 38 by two goals. A number of Football League club records were set during the season, including fewest away defeats (4), fewest defeats (6), most away goals scored (45) and most points (62 – two points for a win). Brentford's average Football League home attendance of 13,300 was the highest in the Third Division South. 1932–33 is statistically Brentford's second-best season, the club having acquired 2.10 points per game under the current ruling of three points awarded for a win.

Reserve team 

Brentford's reserve team finished as champions of the London Combination for the second successive season. The team won all their home matches during the season, which formed a large chunk of the reserve team club record of 43 consecutive home victories, a run which ran from November 1931 to November 1933. Ralph Allen captained the team, scored a large chunk of the goals and the final match of the season versus Aldershot Reserves was played in front of a crowd of 9,000, a club record for a reserve team fixture.

League table

Results
Brentford's goal tally listed first.

Legend

Football League Third Division South

FA Cup

 Sources: Statto, 11v11, 100 Years of Brentford

Playing squad 
Players' ages are as of the opening day of the 1932–33 season.

 Sources: 100 Years of Brentford, Timeless Bees, Football League Players' Records 1888 to 1939

Coaching staff

Statistics

Appearances and goals

Players listed in italics left the club mid-season.
Source: 100 Years of Brentford

Goalscorers 

Players listed in italics left the club mid-season.
Source: 100 Years of Brentford

Amateur international caps

Management

Summary

Transfers & loans 
Cricketers are not included in this list.

References 

Brentford F.C. seasons
Brentford